The Bergevin Brothers are an American Seattle-based band.  Founded by brothers Joe and Jon Bergevin, the band promotes political and other causes through their music.  They are most famous for their song "Fired Up, And Ready to Go", that was inspired by United States President Barack Obama's inauguration.  The band is currently signed to their own record label Bergevin Brothers Music.

The Bergevin Brothers have also created a musical piece for the film Barack Obama: Who is this Guy? The film was released by Veridicus Films in October 2008.  Other projects have included raising money for Hurricane Katrina victims and the Seattle Artists Foundation. Their music will also be featured in the documentary "Barack Obama: The Man and his Journey".

Influences
The Bergevin Brothers list their influences as Elton John, Peter Gabriel, Frank Sinatra, Miles Davis, Pat Metheny, Sting, Billy Joel, Queen, Johnny Cash, Roger Miller, Supertramp, Ray Charles, Frankie Goes To Hollywood, The Eagles, The Doobie Brothers, Madonna and Michael Jackson.

Discography

Filmography

References

External links
 Official website
 Blog

Musical groups from Seattle
American jazz ensembles from Washington (state)
Musicians from Seattle